Semnostoma is a genus of moth in the family Gelechiidae.

Species
 Semnostoma barathrota Meyrick, 1918
 Semnostoma leucochalca Meyrick, 1918
 Semnostoma poecilopa Meyrick, 1918
 Semnostoma scatebrosa Meyrick, 1918

References

Pexicopiini